Aghapura is a neighbourhood in Hyderabad, India. Located between the major suburbs of Hyderabad, Nampally and Mehdipatnam. The area is famous for Aghapura Charkhandil - four lamps which used to exist which would be lit at night. A designated person would light the lamps every day during the evening. Hence this particular spot is still referred to its old name and is a landmark. Aghapura is named after Agha Muhammad Dawood Abul Ulai, a disciple of Sufi saint Shah Mohammed Hassan Abul Ulai. The shrine, also known as Aghapura Dargah, was awarded during world Heritage day.

Transport
Aghapura is connected by buses run by TSRTC.

The closest MMTS train station is at Nampally is about 1 km away.

Business 
Aghapura is the center of attention during the Urs (celebration) of the Aghapura Dargah. This locality is also in highlight for a political reason as the All India Majlis-e-Ittehadul Muslimeen (AIMIM) party's headquarters located at Darussalam.

Neighbourhoods

 Bazar Ghat
 Dhool Pet
 Gosha Mahal
 JiyaGuda
 Karwan
Asifnagar
 Mangalhat
 Mehdipatnam
 Masab Tank
 Murad Nagar
 Nampally
 Seetaram Bagh
 Shantinagar

References

5  hazrat shah mohammed hasan sahib qibla abulullai RH (Bhoiguda kaman) by auliadeccan.com

Neighbourhoods in Hyderabad, India